Páll Ragnar Pálsson, born in Reykjavík, July 25, 1977, is an Icelandic composer.

Studies 
During the years 1993–2004 he was a guitarist in Maus, one of Iceland's most progressive indie rock bands in the 1990s, but took a decisive move towards contemporary classical music in 2004, entering the composition department of Iceland Academy of the Arts (LHÍ). In addition to a graduation chamber piece Páll wrote his BA thesis on Estonian composer Arvo Pärt about whom he has later given lectures and radio programs
Páll continued his studies in 2007 at the Estonian Academy of Music and Theatre, under Helena Tulve, a renowned composer with distinctive musical aesthetics. There he obtained a master's degree in 2009 and a PhD in 2014.

In 2013 Páll moved back to Iceland, but maintained a close contact with Estonia. He adopted his teacher's intuitive method of composing and preserved a status in the Estonian music life. Supremacy of Peace for string orchestra represented Estonia at the International Rostrum of Composers in Prague in 2013 and The ISCM World Music Days in Ljubljana.

Professional career 
Since returning to Iceland, Páll's music frequently depicts movements in nature paralleled to similar processes within human psyche, particularly present in Quake, a piece for solo cello and chamber orchestra. The piece is a Los Angeles Philharmonic and the NDR Elbphilharmonie Orchestra co-commission for Sæunn Þorsteinsdóttir as a soloist. First premiere was in the Elbphilharmonie, conducted by Jonathan Stockhammer, and then in the Walt Disney Hall in Los Angeles by the LA Phil New Music Group at the Reykjavík Festival. Conducted by Daníel Bjarnason.

Páll revisited his indie roots, orchestrating two songs of Iceland's leading band Sigur Rós, Takk... and Glósóli for the Reykjavík Festival in Los Angeles, April 2017, where Esa-Pekka Salonen conducted Sigur Rós and The LA Philharmonic Orchestra three consecutive evenings.

Páll reaches out for touch points with other forms of art. For the opening ceremony of CYCLE Music and Art Festival in Kópavogur, August 2015 Páll built his string orchestra piece Spiegeltunnel on a mirror sculpture of the same title by Ólafur Elíasson, “a conceptual Danish-Icelandic artist concerned with sensorial experience and perception”. Páll's 6-part cycle for a string quartet and soprano, Nature Poems, builds upon the surrealist poetry of Sjón, “a mainstay in Icelandic culture” . The piece was performed at Nordic Music Days in Reykjavík, October 2011.

Discography

Nostalgia 
In June 2017, Páll released his first composer album Nostalgia. The title piece, written for Una Sveinbjarnardóttir on solo violin and the Iceland Symphony Orchestra conducted by Ilan Volkov, was premiered at Dark Music Days 2013. The album was released by Smekkleysa, or Bad Taste, “originally an experimental cultural organization that is now a fully active record company, also prolific in releasing new Icelandic classical music".

Awards 
Quake for cello and orchestra was selected as the most outstanding work at the International Rostrum of Composers in Budapest 2018.

Páll Ragnar received the grant from the memorial fund of Kristján Eldjárn in 2018.

Nostalgia was selected composition of the year at Icelandic Music Awards 2014.

Press 

„Páll Ragnar Pálsson is one of the year’s greatest discoveries, his music both intellectual and visceral, so complex that each subsequent play reveals deeper layers.  The passion stems from his Icelandic heritage, the sophistication from his Estonian experience.  On his debut album, he melts opposing forces together like lava.“

Allen, Richard. ACL 2017 ~ The Top 20 Albums of the Year. A closer Listen, 21.12.2017

„“Quake,” which is for cello solo and large chamber ensemble, is pretty much what its title suggests, the music of the ground not being steady under your feet. Nothing is settled, everything is in trills and tremolos and glissandi. The solo cello, excellently played by Saeunn Thorsteinsdóttir, creaks and moans. But the most effective musical quaking feels interior, evoking the quaking you feel in those first seconds when an earthquake begins, when you first sense the Earth may be moving but have no idea yet how much.“

Swed, Mark. „L.A. Phil's Reykjavík Festival begins with music of the Earth and singing in teacups“ LA Times, 12.04.2017

„Equally stunning, but for very different reasons, was Páll Ragnar Palsson’s deeply emotional Supremacy of Peace which was inspired by the stark contrast of abandoned factories and pristine farmlands in northeast Estonia.“

Oteri, Frank J. „The 2015 ISCM World Music Days“ NewMusicBox 23.10.2015

„The highlight of the event was to be found in the classical side with Páll Ragnar Pálsson; the Icelandic composer unveiled a knockout chamber piece of warping progressions and immaculate metre. The work was designed for a similar event in Amsterdam but it never materialised. Left in a drawer, neglected, it was only when Estonian Music Days heard of the piece's existence did it finally find its performance. The complexity of it was its ability to create rolling emotive sound without falling back on tired symbolism and familiar structure. 'Undir yfirráðum kyrrðar' (tr. 'Supremacy of Peace') performed by the Tallinn Chamber Orchestra.“

Breen, Samuel. „Tallinn Music Week 2013 - Live In Tallinn, Estonia“ Clashmusic.com 10.04.2013

References

Pall Ragnar Palsson
Pall Ragnar Palsson
21st-century classical composers
1977 births
Living people
21st-century male musicians